Chestfield is a village (and civil parish and with Swalecliffe a district council ward) in the Canterbury District of Kent, England. The parish is centred  from the sea on the north coast of Kent, between the towns of Whitstable and Herne Bay. It is approximately five miles (8 km) north of Canterbury.  Over a third of the parish, all of which is the south of its ambit, is woodland.   The north-west consists of a business park and superstore.

Geography
Chestfield & Swalecliffe railway station is on the Chatham Main Line a straight two-track line which marks the northern boundary of the parish.

A footpath and a road each lead to Radfall which is a woodland locality of a few houses on two streets in the wooded hills to the south - more than one third of the parish is woodland, and almost all of it was woodland in the Middle Ages, when it contributed greatly to the Forest of Blean.

The north-east of the parish is non-residential, having a superstore spanning two buildings and the John Wilson business park.

History
The Chestfield Barn originated as part of the Chestfield Manor in the 14th century, a possession of the half-brother of William the Conqueror, Odo, Bishop of Bayeux. It is believed that the Manor dates back to as early as 1084, particularly as it is mentioned in the Domesday Book of 1086. In the early part of the 20th century the barn was converted into a golf house by Abe Mitchell, to service the  golf course constructed in 1924 by George Reeves.

Governance
Chestfield forms part of the electoral ward called Chestfield and Swalecliffe. This ward had a population of 8,398 at the 2011 Census.

Transport
Thanet Way provides a goods and long-distance commuter alternative to the railway station. However, much of the rest of the parish is better served by footpaths and country lanes suitable for cycling.

See also
Saxon Shore Way - this links to various footpaths in the area.

References

External links

Villages in Kent
Civil parishes in Kent
City of Canterbury